Daniel Downs (December 2, 1824 – September 14, 1897) was a member of the Wisconsin State Assembly and the Wisconsin State Senate.

Biography
Downs was born in Trumbull County, Ohio. A Congregationalist, Downs married Mary D. Cowen in 1850. They would have four children. Previously, Downs had completed his education at Rush Medical College. During the American Civil War, he served with the 46th Wisconsin Volunteer Infantry Regiment of the Union Army as a surgeon.

Political career
Downs was a member of the Assembly in 1855. In 1860, Downs changed his party affiliation from Democratic to Republican. He was a member of the Senate from 1876 to 1877 representing the 28th District. Other positions he held include County Treasurer of Richland County, Wisconsin and Richland County judge.

He died at home at the age of 73, following a stroke the week before.

References

1824 births
Year of death missing
People from Richland County, Wisconsin
Wisconsin state court judges
Wisconsin state senators
Members of the Wisconsin State Assembly
County treasurers in Wisconsin
County judges in the United States
Wisconsin Republicans
Wisconsin Democrats
People of Wisconsin in the American Civil War
Union Army surgeons
American Congregationalists
19th-century Congregationalists
Physicians from Wisconsin
Rush Medical College alumni